Vice Admiral Leslie Haliburton Ashmore,  (21 February 1893 – 10 January 1974) was a Royal Navy officer who served as Flag Officer commanding the Reserve Fleet from 1945 to 1947.

Naval career
Ashmore joined the Royal Navy in 1906 and was commissioned in 1915 during the First World War. He became commanding officer of the cruiser  in 1938, just before the start of the Second World War and then became Naval Assistant to the Second Sea Lord in 1940. He became commanding officer of the battleship  in 1942 and then commanding officer of the battleship  in 1943. He went on to be Flag Officer commanding the Reserve Fleet in 1945 before retiring in 1947. He died in Kent at the age of 80.

Family
Ashmore was married to Tamara Vasilevna Schutt. One son, Sir Edward Ashmore, became admiral of the fleet and Chief of the Defence Staff, while another was Vice Admiral Sir Peter Ashmore, who was the Master of the Household to HM the Queen from 1973 to 1986.

References

External links 

 The Papers of Leslie Ashmore held at Churchill Archives Centre

1893 births
1974 deaths
Companions of the Distinguished Service Order
Companions of the Order of the Bath
Royal Navy admirals of World War II
Royal Navy personnel of World War I
Military personnel from London